Congress Street is a QLINE streetcar station in Detroit, Michigan. Located in the city's Financial District near the edge of Downtown, Congress Street serves as the QLINE's southern terminus. The station opened for service on May 12, 2017. It is two blocks away from the Detroit People Mover's Financial District station.

Destinations
 Guardian Building
 One Detroit Center
 One Woodward Avenue
 The Spirit of Detroit
 Coleman A. Young Municipal Center
 The Qube
 First National Building
 Philip A. Hart Plaza

Station
The station is sponsored by Quicken Loans. It is heated and features security cameras and emergency phones. Passenger amenities include Wi-Fi and arrival signs.

See also

Streetcars in North America

References

Tram stops of QLine
Railway stations in the United States opened in 2017
2017 establishments in Michigan